Mirabella Viliamivna Akhunu (born 7 June 1987) is a Ukrainian artistic gymnast. She competed in the 2004 Summer Olympics.

See also
List of Olympic female artistic gymnasts for Ukraine

References

1987 births
Living people
Gymnasts at the 2004 Summer Olympics
Ukrainian female artistic gymnasts
Olympic gymnasts of Ukraine
Gymnasts from Kyiv
21st-century Ukrainian women